Octavia A. Dobre is a professor and research chair of Memorial University. She is a Fellow of the Engineering Institute of Canada and a Fellow of the IEEE.

She is the editor-in-chief of the IEEE Open Journal of the Communications Society and former editor-in-chief of IEEE Communications Letters. She is also a member of the board of governors of the IEEE Communications Society.

Research 
Dobre's research interests lie in wireless communications, optical communications, underwater communications, and signal processing for communications.

References 

Fellows of the Engineering Institute of Canada
Fellow Members of the IEEE
Canadian engineers
Canadian women engineers
Living people
Year of birth missing (living people)